Richards Bay Football Club is a South African football club based in Richards Bay, KwaZulu-Natal, South Africa.

The club was formed when Thanda Royal Zulu F.C. owner Pierre Delvaux sold the club's league status to AmaZulu F.C. AmaZulu had finished in fifth place during the 2016–17 National First Division, Thanda Royal Zulu had finished in first place, achieving automatic promotion. AmaZulu bought the placing from Thanda Royal Zulu, taking the position in the 2017–18 South African Premier Division.

On 7 February 2021, the club achieved the biggest win in their history when they defeated top Premier Soccer League side Kaizer Chiefs F.C. 2-1, in a Nedbank Cup last 32 match.

Current squad

References 

Soccer clubs in KwaZulu-Natal
Association football clubs established in 2017
2017 establishments in South Africa
National First Division clubs
Richards Bay